Smugglers' Songs is a 2011 French adventure film written and directed by Rabah Ameur-Zaïmeche. It won the 2011 Prix Jean Vigo award.

Plot
Following the death of the notorious smuggler Louis Mandrin his old friends walk in his footsteps and make him popular by composing and singing songs about him.

Cast
 Jacques Nolot as Le marquis
 Christian Milia-Darmezin as Le colporteur Jean Sératin
 Kenji Levan as Court-Toujours
 Rabah Ameur-Zaïmeche as Bélissard
 Salim Ameur-Zaïmeche as Malice
 Sylvain Roume as Ma Noblesse
 Nicolas Bancilhon as Blondin
 Abel Jafri as La Buse
 Sylvain Rifflet as La Flûte
 Sylvia Albaret as Mandrinette
 Xavier Pons as Le sergent
 Jean-Luc Nancy as L'imprimeur Jean-Luc Cynan
 Yann-Yvon Pennec as Le brigadier-chef

References

External links
 

2011 films
French adventure films
2010s French-language films
2010s adventure films
Films set in the 1750s
2010s French films